Sextus Vettulenus Civica Cerialis was a Roman senator of the early second century. He was ordinary consul in AD 106 as the colleague of Lucius Ceionius Commodus. No further details of his career are attested.

Cerialis is considered the son of Sextus Vettulenus Cerialis, general and suffect consul in either 72 or 73. The younger Cerialis was married twice. By his first wife, whose name is not known, he had at least one son, Sextus Vettulenus Civica Pompeianus, consul in 136. By his second wife, whose name has been surmised as Plautia, Cerialis had another son, Marcus Vettulenus Civica Barbarus, consul in 157.

References 

1st-century Romans
2nd-century Romans
Senators of the Roman Empire
Imperial Roman consuls
Civica Cerialis